TAI Baykuş is a radio-controlled tactical unmanned drone designed, developed and built by Turkish Aerospace Industries (TAI) between 2003-2004.

Baykuş is the Turkish word for "owl". TAI produces other UAVs named after birds.

Development
The UAV was developed based on the experience gained by its half-sized model TAI Pelikan.

The shoulder-winged UAV has all composite material airframe with metal twin tail booms. The drone is propelled by two 2-cylinder 2-stroke gasoline engines of type JPX DC320 from France with 2 x  power. There exist two versions of TAI Baykuş related to propeller configuration, a pusher and a tractor aircraft.

The drone carries a two-axis gimbaled EO/IR camera, which relays its video in real-time telemetry. Its guidance/tracking takes place fully autonomous based on INS/GPS integrated waypoint navigation system. Take off and landing of the drone is accomplished in conventional way on wheels.

Specifications

See also
 Bayraktar Mini UAV
 Bayraktar TB2
 Bayraktar Akıncı
 Bayraktar Tactical UAS
 TAI Anka
 TAI Aksungur

References

Unmanned military aircraft of Turkey
Reconnaissance aircraft
Baykus
Twin-engined push-pull aircraft
Twin-boom aircraft
High-wing aircraft